This article contains encyclicals issued by Pope Leo XIII during his twenty-five-year reign as Pope in 1878–1903.

See also
 Apostolicae curae

References

External links
 Encyclicals of Pope Leo XIII

Leo 13